is an MMORPG video game in the Tokimeki Memorial series.

No game in the series has ever been translated or officially released in the West, though they can easily be purchased from import game stores.  In the case of Tokimeki Memorial Online (TMO), the basic version is a free download.

In order to play TMO, one must set up a free Konami ID and buy an account key from Konami with Japan-issued credit card or WebMoney; it is possible for people outside Japan to buy WebMoney via e-currency exchange between e-currencies such as PayPal, e-Gold, and WebMoney.

The PC servers for the game were shut down on July 31, 2007.

The anime Tokimeki Memorial Only Love is based on Tokimeki Memorial Online.

Development
Production was first announced with the official site's opening on February 24, 2005. The first beta testers were acquired during August 2005.

Marketing
To help market the game, Konami built a Tokimeki Internet cafe in the Harajuku area of Tokyo, Japan made to look like a classroom from the game.

Characters
 Sayuri Amamiya (天宮 小百合) Voiced by: Yuki Makishima
 Haru Sakurai (桜井 晴) Voiced by: Ryohei Nakao
 Tsukasa Kasuga (春日 つかさ) Voiced by: Yukako Yoshikawa
 Mina Yayoi (弥生 水奈) Voiced by: Saki Fujita
 Kōya Inukai (犬飼 洸也) Voiced by: Hiroki Takahashi

Notes

References

External links
 Official site

2006 video games
Japan-exclusive video games
Massively multiplayer online role-playing games
Tokimeki Memorial
Video games developed in Japan
Windows games
Windows-only games